Temple Beth El of Northern Westchester is a Reform Jewish congregation in Chappaqua, New York. Founded in 1949, it is notable for its synagogue building, designed by Louis Kahn.  Although Kahn designed other synagogues, this is the only one of his designs that was built.

According to the National Trust for Historic Preservation, Kahn accepted the commission in 1966, and completed plans for the octagonal sanctuary six years later.

References

Louis Kahn buildings
Reform synagogues in New York (state)
Synagogues completed in 1972
Jewish organizations established in 1949
1949 establishments in New York (state)